The 1992 Southwest Conference men's basketball tournament was held March 14–0, 1992, at Reunion Arena in Dallas, Texas. 

Number 2 seed Houston defeated 1 seed Texas 91-72 to win their 5th championship and receive the conference's automatic bid to the 1992 NCAA tournament.

Format and seeding 
The tournament consisted of the top 8 teams playing in a single-elimination tournament.

Tournament

References 

1991–92 Southwest Conference men's basketball season
Basketball in the Dallas–Fort Worth metroplex
Southwest Conference men's basketball tournament